Direct may refer to:

Mathematics 
 Directed set, in order theory
 Direct limit of (pre), sheaves
 Direct sum of modules, a construction in abstract algebra which combines several vector spaces

Computing 
 Direct access (disambiguation), a method of accessing data in a database
 Direct connect (disambiguation), various methods of telecommunications and computer networking
 Direct memory access, access to memory by hardware subsystems independently of the CPU

Entertainment 
 Direct (Tower of Power album)
 Direct (Vangelis album)
 Direct (EP),  by The 77s

Other uses 
 Nintendo Direct, an online presentation frequently held by Nintendo
 Mars Direct, a proposal for a crewed mission to Mars
 DIRECT, a proposed space shuttle-derived launch vehicle
 DirectX, a proprietary dynamic media platform
 Direct current, a direct flow of electricity
 Direct examination, the in-trial questioning of a witness by the party who has called him or her to testify

See also 
 
 
 Direction (disambiguation)
 Director (disambiguation)
 Indirect (disambiguation)